The Order No. 1 was issued March 1, 1917 (March 14 New Style) and was the first official decree of the Petrograd Soviet of Workers' and Soldiers' Deputies. The order was issued following the February Revolution in response to actions taken the day before by the Provisional Committee of the State Duma, headed by Mikhail Rodzianko. On February 28, the Provisional Committee, acting as a government following the disintegration of Tsarist authority in Petrograd and fearing that the soldiers who had gone over to the revolution on February 26–27 (O.S.) without their officers (who had generally fled) constituted a potentially uncontrollable mob that might threaten the Duma, issued an order through the Military Commission of the Duma calling on the soldiers to return to their barracks and to obey their officers. The soldiers were skeptical of this order; for one thing, they saw Rodzianko as too close to the Tsar (he had been Chairman of the Fourth Duma, which was seen as quite supportive of the Tsar). Some soldiers perhaps feared that in sending them back to their barracks, he was attempting to quash the Revolution, though most were concerned that in being sent back to the barracks they would be placed under their old commanders whose heavy-handedness had led them to mutiny on the 26th; thus their grievances would go unaddressed. In response, the Petrograd Soviet issued Order Number 1.

The order instructed soldiers and sailors to obey their officers and the Provisional Government only if their orders did not contradict the decrees of the Petrograd Soviet. It also called on units to elect representatives to the Soviet and for each unit to elect a committee which would run the unit. All weapons were to be handed over to these committees "and shall by no means be issued to the officers, not even at their insistence." The order also allowed soldiers to dispense with standing to attention and saluting when off duty, although while on duty strict military discipline was to be maintained. Officers were no longer to be addressed as "Your Excellency" but rather as "Sir" ("Gospodin", in Russian). Soldiers of all ranks were to be addressed formally (with "vy" instead of "ty").

There is a widespread belief that Order Number 1 infamously allowed for the election of officers, thus completely undermining military discipline. The order, however, actually makes no provision for the election of officers. The elections spoken of in the order itself are for representatives to the Petrograd Soviet. The discrepancy is explained by the fact that a proclamation was issued by the Russian Social Democratic Labour Party (RSDLP – essentially the Communists, divided between the Mensheviks and the Bolsheviks) and the Petrograd Committee of Socialist Revolutionaries (SRs) at about the same time calling on "Comrade Soldiers" to "elect for yourself platoon, company and regimental commanders." Part of the debate leading up to Order Number 1 included talk of "sorting out" unfriendly (pro-Tsarist or anti-revolutionary) officers and excluding them from units. This may have been taken as a call for the election of officers. However, while unsympathetic, untrustworthy, or undesirable officers were blacklisted and forced out of their units, the actual election of officers did not take place.

The order's impact
The order was highly controversial. Leon Trotsky may have called it "the only worthy document of February Revolution," but others have seen the measure as an effort to prevent continuation of Russia's war effort by crippling the government's control of the military, or even as part of a plot by the Bolsheviks to undermine the Provisional Government. Many scholars have argued that, in the former sense, it succeeded. Thus, Michael Florinsky wrote that "it struck at the very heart of army discipline and contributed powerfully to the breakdown of the armed forces." As to the latter theory of a Bolshevik plot, George Katkov advanced this theory.

That being said, the goal of those who issued the order was to restore discipline to the army and address the problem of how to deal with officers who were said to be returning to their units after the February Revolution yet were continuing to lord it over and abuse their troops (as several soldiers complained before the Petrograd Soviet during the debate over the order). It was not meant to apply to the armies at the front (as the sixth paragraph of the order makes clear, it was only to apply while soldiers were off duty), and thus it is unclear the extent to which Order Number 1 alone led to the breakdown of the Russian Army.
On the other hand its immediate impact was very clear. No more than 48 hours after its proclamation, the Executive Committee tried to issue “Order Number Two” in an unsuccessful attempt “to annul the first order, limiting its application to the Petrograd military district”. It was “in vain”, continued Leon Trotsky. “Order Number One was indestructible”.

References

External links
 The Text of Order Number 1

Russian Revolution
History of Saint Petersburg
1917 in Russia
1917 documents